Damilola Ogunbiyi   is a global leader and advocate for the achievement of the Sustainable Development Goals (SDGs) with a focus on SDG7, which calls for access to reliable, affordable, sustainable, and modern energy for all by 2030. She is the Chief Executive Officer of Sustainable Energy for All, the Special Representative of the UN Secretary-General for Sustainable Energy for All, and Co-Chair of UN-Energy. 

With Mrs. Ogunbiyi at the helm, Sustainable Energy for All (SEforALL) has entered into working relationships with over 200 partners, supported over 90 countries globally, and secured commitments of more than $600 billion in energy finance. This has been achieved through programmes such as Universal Energy Facility, Powering Healthcare, Women and Youth at the Forefront, Cooling for All, and Clean Cooking; and innovative initiatives such as UN Energy Compacts, Energy Transition Plans, Universal Integrated Energy Plans, the Africa Carbon Markets Initiative (ACMI), and the Renewable Energy Manufacturing Initiative (REMI) among many others. Through her leadership, SEforALL has grown its global influence and country support providing clear pathways to accelerate progress towards universal energy access, ending energy poverty, and advancing the global just and equitable energy transition.

Prior to joining SEforALL, Mrs. Ogunbiyi was the first female Managing Director of the Nigerian Rural Electrification Agency where she initiated the Nigerian Electrification Project, a USD 550 million facility which is a joint World Bank and African Development Bank programme that to date provided energy access to over 5 million people across Nigeria. She also conceptualised the Energizing Economies Initiative, estimated to impact 1.2 million SMEs. 

Before joining the Federal Government of Nigeria (FGN), Mrs. Ogunbiyi was the first female General Manager of the Lagos State Electricity Board. Under her leadership, five independent power projects were completed to deliver over 55 megawatts of power to Lagos State hospitals, schools, and government facilities.  

Mrs. Ogunbiyi is a member of the Global Leadership Council (GLC) of the Global Energy Alliance for People and Planet (GEAPP), an Advisory Board member of the Center on Global Energy Policy, a member of the Development Advisory Council of the U.S. International Development Finance Corporation (DFC), a member of the Clean Cooking Alliance Advisory Board, and a member of the Advisory Board of University of Oxford’s Future of Cooling Programme.

Education
 2001 – B.Sc. Project Management with Construction, University of Brighton
 2002 – M.Sc. Construction Management with Public Private Partnership, University of Brighton

Career
 2008–2010 – Consultant, Department for International Development, Government of the United Kingdom
 2010–2011 – Senior Special Assistant on PPP to the Governor of Lagos State, Lagos State Government
 2011–2015 – General Manager, Lagos State Electricity Board, Lagos State Government
 2015–2019 – Senior Special Assistant to the President of Nigeria and Head of Advisory Power Team, Office of the Vice President, Federal Government of Nigeria
 2017–2019 – Managing Director, Rural Electrification Agency, Federal Government of Nigeria
 2020 – Chief Executive Officer, Sustainable Energy for All
 2020 – Co-Chair, UN-Energy
 2020 – Special Representative of the Secretary-General for Sustainable Energy for All, United Nations

References

Living people
Government ministers of Nigeria
Special Representatives of the Secretary-General of the United Nations
Alumni of the University of Brighton
Fellows of the Royal Academy of Engineering
Female Fellows of the Royal Academy of Engineering
Place of birth missing (living people)
Date of birth missing (living people)
Year of birth missing (living people)